Jeffris David Hopkins (born 23 August 1950) is a former Welsh cricketer.  Hopkins was a right-handed batsman who fielded as a wicket-keeper.  He was born at Bridgend, Glamorgan.

Having played for the Glamorgan Second XI since in 1967 and 1968, Hopkins joined Middlesex for the 1969 season, making his first-class debut in that same season against Lancashire in the County Championship.  He also made his List A debut in that same season, against Essex in the Player's County League.  With opportunities limited at Middlesex due to presence of regular wicket-keeper John Murray, Hopkins made just three further first-class appearances, the last of which came against Northamptonshire in the 1972 County Championship, as well as appearing in just one more List A match, against Derbyshire in the 1971 John Player League.  Hopkins failed to make an impression at Middlesex, scoring 8 runs at an average of 1.60 in first-class cricket, while taking 9 catches.

He later appeared for Wales in their only ICC Trophy appearance in 1979, playing in three matches against the Netherlands, Israel and the United States.  He made scores of 92 against Israel and 72 against the United States.

Hopkins' brother, John, also played first-class cricket.

References

External links

1950 births
Living people
Sportspeople from Bridgend
Welsh cricketers
Middlesex cricketers
Wicket-keepers